Boeritsa Point (‘Nos Boeritsa’ \'nos 'bo-e-ri-tsa\) is the rocky point on the southeast coast of South Bay, Hurd Peninsula on Livingston Island in the South Shetland Islands, Antarctica formed by an offshoot of Atlantic Club Ridge.  Its shape is enhanced by the retreat of adjacent Contell Glacier in the late 20th and early 21st century.

The feature is named after the settlement of Boeritsa in western Bulgaria.

Location
Bulgarian mapping in 1996 and 2009.

Maps
 L.L. Ivanov. Livingston Island: Central-Eastern Region. Scale 1:25000 topographic map.  Sofia: Antarctic Place-names Commission of Bulgaria, 1996.
 L.L. Ivanov. Antarctica: Livingston Island and Greenwich, Robert, Snow and Smith Islands. Scale 1:120000 topographic map.  Troyan: Manfred Wörner Foundation, 2009.

References
 Boeritsa Point. SCAR Composite Antarctic Gazetteer.
 Bulgarian Antarctic Gazetteer. Antarctic Place-names Commission. (details in Bulgarian, basic data in English)

External links
 Boeritsa Point. Copernix satellite image

Headlands of Livingston Island
Bulgaria and the Antarctic